Dimitrios Gioukoudis (born 27 August 1997) is a Greek professional footballer who plays as a forward for Super League 2 club Veria.

References

1997 births
Living people
Greek footballers
Super League Greece 2 players
Almopos Aridea F.C. players
Association football forwards